Elena Vtorygina (born 17 August 1957, Arkhangelsk) is a Russian political figure and a deputy of the 5th, 6th, 7th, and 8th State Dumas.
 
In 1979, Vtorygina started working as the Chairman of the trade union committee of the specialized school 15. From 1982 to 1986, she was the methodologist in the trade union committee of the Solombala Pulp and Paper Mill. In the 1990s, Vtorygina became the head of the regional public organization "Union of Business Women". In 1999, she started working at the administration of the Arkhangelsk Oblast. In December 2004, she was elected deputy of the Arkhangelsk Oblast Assembly of Deputies of the 4th convocation. In 2007, she was elected deputy of the 5th. On May 18, 2011, she voluntarily resigned the mandate in favor of Sergey Mironov after he lost his place at the Federation Council. In 2012, she was appointed Advisor to the Governor of the Arkhangelsk Oblast [[Igor Orlov (politician)
Igor Orlov]]. In March 2013, Vladimir Pekhtin resigned his deputy powers ahead of schedule, and on April 3, Elena Vtorigina received a vacated mandate and became a member of the 6th State Duma. In 2016 and 2021, she was elected deputy of the 7th, and 8th State Dumas, respectively.

References
 

 

1957 births
Living people
United Russia politicians
21st-century Russian politicians
21st-century Russian women politicians
Eighth convocation members of the State Duma (Russian Federation)
Seventh convocation members of the State Duma (Russian Federation)
Sixth convocation members of the State Duma (Russian Federation)
Fifth convocation members of the State Duma (Russian Federation)